Leziate is a village and civil parish in the English county of Norfolk. The Village is located a small distance south of the B1145 a route which runs between King's Lynn and Mundesley. The nearest railway station is at King's Lynn for the Fen Line which runs between King's Lynn and Cambridge. The nearest airport is Norwich International Airport. The parish of Leziate in the 2001 census, has a population of 581, including Ashwicken and increasing to 592 at the 2011 census.

History
This large parish is in the west of the county located east of the town of King's Lynn. The parish is bordered with Grimston to the north, East Winch to the south, Bawsey to the west and Gayton to the east. There are two hamlets within the parish and they are Leziate and Ashwicken, both these settlements are described as a shrunken village. During the medieval period the village of Leziate was much larger, but the village had shrunk sufficiently by the late 15th century for the parish of Leziate to be united with Ashwicken. The name Leziate comes from the Old English meaning meadow gate, while the name Ashwicken is  also derived from Old English and means either place at the dwellings or buildings or place at the ash trees.

In 1086, when the Domesday Book was compiled, Leziate was in the hundred of Freebridge, and was quite small, with just three households. It had  of meadow land and a mill.
Leziate once had a parish church of All Saints, situated on a plot to the east of Leziate Drove. A list of its possessions compiled in 1368 mentions a chapel of St Thomes. After the parish was united with Ashwicken in the late 15th century, Thomas Thursby, the Lord of the Manor, was accused of appropriating most of the common land for himself, by enclosing it, and of evicting tenants from their homes before demolishing them. In 1602 Mr Bramwell, the parson, had removed the lead from the roof of the chancel of the church without authority, causing it to become ruined, but services were still held in the rest of the building until the late 1700s, by which time it was decrepit. It was demolished soon after 1816, so there are now no remains above ground, and the site is a scheduled monument. The remains of the parish church of Bawsey, dedicated to St Michael, are also within the parish, further to the west. This is a grade II* listed site, as much of the 12th century structure remains intact, although the font is now in the garden of Whitehouse Farmhouse.

Between 1846 and 1968, the village was served by Middleton Towers railway station. This was on the Lynn and Dereham Railway, which ran between King's Lynn and Dereham. When the railway opened, the station was known at Middleton, but it was renamed as Middleton Towers on 1 November 1924. Following the publication of Dr Richard Beeching's report in 1963, closure of Norfolk's railways began in earnest, with Middleton Towers becoming an unstaffed halt in 1966, and the final passenger trains running on 7 September 1968. The station building is actually in the adjacent parish of Middleton, although the railway to the east and west of the platforms lies in Leziate.

Soon after the opening of the line, extraction of high grade silica sand began from pits to the north of the railway. It was used for the manufacture of glass. A siding was constructed to the west of the level crossing in 1881, allowing a Mr Bagge to trade in sand and coal. The operation had ceased by the early 1900s, and Old Carr was used for forestry. However, a new siding to the east of the station was approved on 1 March 1904, for the use of J Boam & Sons, again for sand traffic. A 20-ton weighbridge was installed in 1907, and the railway minutes quote 3,000 wagons of sand per year, but are unclear as to whether this was the projected or actual traffic. After closure of the line to Dereham, the section between Middleton Towers and King's Lynn remained open for the sand traffic and a new run-round loop was constructed to the east of the station buildings. British Industrial Sand took over Boam's siding on 23 March 1981, and shortly afterwards, the railway sidings and tramway were replaced by conveyors. Some of the tramway track had previously been acquired by the East Anglia Transport Museum, and was reused to construct their East Suffolk Light Railway.

The extraction of silica sand has continued, although by 2015 the operation was owned by Sibelco. Around 800,000 tonnes of sand are extracted each year, of which three-quarters is transported away by rail. Trains normally consist of over 30 wagons, into which 1,000 tonnes of sand are loaded from a gantry which straddles the track. Two trains each day take sand to three glass factories, at Barnsley, Doncaster and Goole, although more trains are run when hot weather or major sporting events increase the volume of glass needed.

Governance
Leziate is a parish of the Kings Lynn and West Norfolk district council, which is responsible for the most local services. Norfolk County Council is responsible for roads, some schools, and social services. For Westminster elections it forms part of the North West Norfolk constituency, represented by James Wild (Conservative).

The deserted village of Holt
During the medieval period there was another settlement within the parish. It was called Holt. The village was demolished when the landlord, the notorious Thomas Thursby, enclosed the land and converted it to pasture for his sheep. Holt was the only Norfolk village recorded in the Commission of Inquiry in 1517 as being totally depopulated in this way.

References

Bibliography

Villages in Norfolk
King's Lynn and West Norfolk
Civil parishes in Norfolk
Deserted medieval villages in Norfolk